The Apple Blossom Mall is a  shopping mall that was built in 1982 on the south side of Winchester, Virginia. It has 83 stores. Its anchor stores are Belk (former Leggett), AMC Classic, and JCPenney. The mall's one vacant anchor space was once occupied by Sears. The shopping mall was acquired by Simon Property Group in 1999. It is now managed and 49.1% owned by Simon Property Group.

In 2007, Simon Property Group announced a major lifestyle redevelopment at Apple Blossom Mall, including the addition of a RC Theatres 16-screen complex on the property. Construction on the theatres was to begin in the spring of 2007 with the opening scheduled for late 2007 or early 2008. This lifestyle center which was to include three lifestyle-type tenants, two big boxes, an additional department store and new restaurants never materialized. There is now an AMC Classic (formerly Carmike) located in the mall.

In mid-2012, mall representatives announced renovation plans for the mall. Among them will be new floors and lighting, a children's play area, and a 12-screen theater to replace the existing theater.

On November 7, 2019, it was announced that Sears would be closing this location a part of a plan to close 96 stores nationwide. The store closed in February 2020.

On March 29, 2020, the mall closed temporarily due to COVID-19 concerns. It reopened on May 15, 2020.

References

External links
 

Shopping malls in Virginia
Shopping malls established in 1982
Simon Property Group
Winchester, Virginia
1982 establishments in Virginia